Hersa Sheikh is a town in Chiniot District, Punjab Province, Pakistan with a population of over 6,000 people. It is located at coordinates 31.792 N 73.128 E.
 
Its name means "Place of Three Saints" and is a compound of the Persian words her, seh, and sheikh. One of the saints is Saadan Jawaan aka Sheikh Sa'ad(RA), whose tomb is located in the town. His direct descendants, called the Nekokara, reside in Hersa Sheikh and in a nearby village, Thatha Karam Shah.

References

Chiniot District
Populated places in Chiniot District